Martin Hotel may refer to:
in the United States
(by state then city)
 Martin Hotel (Sioux City, Iowa), listed on the National Register of Historic Places (NRHP)
 Martin Hotel (Versailles, Missouri), listed on the NRHP in Morgan County
 Martin Hotel (Winnemucca, Nevada), listed on the NRHP in Humboldt County

See also
Martin Building (disambiguation)
Martin Hall (disambiguation)
Martin House (disambiguation)

Architectural disambiguation pages